In geometric group theory, a discipline of mathematics, subgroup distortion measures the extent to which an overgroup can reduce the complexity of a group's word problem.  Like much of geometric group theory, the concept is due to Misha Gromov, who introduced it in 1993.

Subgroups with constant distortion are called quasiconvex.

Examples
For example, consider the infinite cyclic group , embedded as a normal subgroup of the Baumslag–Solitar group . In particular,  is at least exponentially distorted with base .

Similarly, the same infinite cyclic group, embedded in the free abelian group on two generators , has linear distortion; the embedding in itself as  only produces constant distortion.

Elementary properties

For many non-normal but still abelian subgroups, the distortion of the normal core gives a strong lower bound.

Known values
Every computable function with at most exponential growth can be a subgroup distortion, but Lie subgroups of a nilpotent Lie group always have distortion  for some rational .

The denominator in the definition is always ; for this reason, it is often omitted.  In that case, a subgroup that is not locally finite has superadditive distortion; conversely every superadditive function (up to asymptotic equivalence) can be found this way.

In cryptography
The simplification in a word problem induced by subgroup distortion suffices to construct a cryptosystem, algorithms for encoding and decoding secret messages. Formally, the plaintext message is any object (such as text, images, or numbers) that can be encoded as a number . The transmitter then encodes  as an element  with word length .

References 

Geometric group theory
Low-dimensional topology